Rae Waters is a Democratic politician. She served as one of the two State Representatives for Arizona's 20th Legislative district from 2009 to 2011. She lost her re-election bid in the 2010 election.

Waters is also in her 12th year serving on the local Kyrene Elementary School District Governing Board, where she has served three terms as president.  Her term expired in 2010.

Political Positions

According to Votesmart.org, Waters received a 100% rating from Planned Parenthood, an 'A' from the Sierra Club, and a 'D' from the NRA.

References

External links

 Representative Rae Waters – District 20 Official State Representative website
 Profile at Project Vote Smart
 Follow the Money – Rae Waters
 2008 State House campaign contributions
 2010 State House campaign contributions

1956 births
Living people
Democratic Party members of the Arizona House of Representatives
Women state legislators in Arizona
21st-century American women